The 2018 Segundona was the 24th season of the second-tier football league in Angola. The season started on 9 June.

The league comprises 2 series, one 4 and the other 5 teams, the winner of each series being automatically promoted to the 2018–19 Girabola while the runners-up of each group will contest for the third spot. At the end of the regular season, the three series winners will play a round-robin tournament to determine the league champion.

Stadia and locations

Draw

All teams in each group play in a double round robin system (home and away).

Serie A

Match details

Round 1

Round 8

Round 2

Round 9

Round 3

Round 10

Round 4

Round 11

Round 5

Round 12

Round 6

Round 13

Round 7

Round 14

Table and results

Serie B

Match details

Round 1

Round 6

Round 2

Round 7

Round 3

Round 8

Round 4

Round 9

Round 5

Round 10

Table and results

2018–19 Girabola playoff

2018 Segundona title match

Season statistics

Hat-tricks

References

See also
2018 Girabola

External links
Federação Angolana de Futebol

Segundona
Segundona
Angola